Ivana Pižlová is a former Czech football goalkeeper, currently playing for Slovan Liberec in the Czech Women's First League.

She was a member of the Czech national team.

References

External links
 
 
 

1981 births
Living people
Czech women's footballers
Czech Republic women's international footballers
Women's association football goalkeepers
AC Sparta Praha (women) players
SK Slavia Praha (women) players
Czech Women's First League players
FC Slovan Liberec players